Cervo–San Bartolomeo railway station served the towns of Cervo and San Bartolomeo al Mare, in the Liguria region, northwestern Italy. Opened in 1872, it formed part of the Genoa–Ventimiglia railway, and was situated about two thirds along the way from Genoa towards Ventimiglia. It was replaced on December 11, 2016, by a new station in Diano Castello, Diano, situated on a new double-track line replacing the old coastal route.

The station's reception building featured a waiting room and ticket machine. The trains were operated by Trenitalia.

Train services
The station was last served by the following service(s):

Regional services (Treno regionale) Ventimiglia - Savona - Genoa - Sestri Levante - La Spezia - San Stefano di Magra

See also

History of rail transport in Italy
List of railway stations in Liguria
Rail transport in Italy
Railway stations in Italy

References

This article is based upon a translation of the Italian language version as at May 2017.

External links

Province of Imperia
Railway stations in Liguria
Railway stations opened in 1872
Railway stations closed in 2016